The Ialomicioara is a left tributary of the river Ialomița in Romania. It discharges into the Ialomița in Pucheni.

References

Rivers of Romania
Rivers of Dâmbovița County